Odette Richard (18 July 1988 – December 2020) was a South African individual rhythmic gymnast. She represented her nation at international competitions. She participated at the 2008 Summer Olympics in Beijing.

She also competed at world championships, including at the 2005 and 2007 World Rhythmic Gymnastics Championships.

References

External links

http://www.zimbio.com/Odette+Richard/pictures/pro
http://www.zampablu.it/interview/081120_richard_en.php

1988 births
2020 deaths
South African rhythmic gymnasts
Place of birth missing
Gymnasts at the 2008 Summer Olympics
Olympic gymnasts of South Africa
Gymnasts at the 2006 Commonwealth Games
Commonwealth Games competitors for South Africa
20th-century South African women
21st-century South African women